Dilip Kumar Singh is an Indian politician, currently a member of Bharatiya Janata Party and a Member of Legislative Council from Aurangabad, Bihar.

References 

Living people
Members of the Bihar Legislative Council
Year of birth missing (living people)
Bharatiya Janata Party politicians from Bihar